The West Klinaklini River is a brief but voluminous tributary of the Klinaklini River in British Columbia, Canada, joining it in its lower reaches above its mouth into Knight Inlet.  Only 7 km long, it is formed by the meltwater from the Klinaklini Glacier, the main tongue of the vast Ha-Iltzuk Icefield (Silverthrone Glacier), which lies west of the Klinaklini.

References

Rivers of the Central Coast of British Columbia
Rivers of the Pacific Ranges